The 2015 MSA Formula Championship was a multi-event, Formula 4 open-wheel single seater motor racing championship held across England and Scotland. The championship featured a mix of professional motor racing teams and privately funded drivers, competing in Formula 4 cars that conformed to the technical regulations for the championship. This, the inaugural season, following on from the British Formula Ford Championship, was the first year that the cars conformed to the FIA's Formula 4 regulations. Part of the TOCA tour, it formed part of the extensive program of support categories built up around the British Touring Car Championship centrepiece.

The season commenced on 5 April at Brands Hatch – on the circuit's Indy configuration – and concluded on 11 October at the same venue, utilising the Grand Prix circuit, after thirty races held at ten meetings, all in support of the 2015 British Touring Car Championship.

Lando Norris won the championship with eight victories, 42 points ahead of Ricky Collard, who won six races. Third-placed Colton Herta came out victorious four times, Sennan Fielding and second-highest placed rookie Dan Ticktum won three races each, Matheus Leist and Sandy Mitchell won twice respectively, and Josh Smith and top rookie Enaam Ahmed both triumphed just once.

Championship changes
The championship adopted the technical regulations for the new FIA Formula 4 specification, becoming the official F4 championship in the United Kingdom. The championship kept the Ford EcoBoost engine but with a power reduction from 200 bhp to 160 bhp, as per the F4 regulations. The new regulations moved to a new carbon fibre monocoque chassis which met FIA F3 safety standards.

Teams and drivers
All teams were British-registered.

Race calendar and results
The calendar for the 2015 TOCA package was announced on 14 September 2014. The Oulton Park round reverted to the Island layout, after using the International circuit in 2014. All races were held in the United Kingdom.

Championship standings

Points were awarded as follows:

Drivers' championship

Rookie Cup

Nations Cup

Teams Cup

References

External links
 

F4 British Championship seasons
Msa
MSA Formula
MSA Formula